Tanaquil is an oil on wood painting by Domenico Beccafumi, which depicts Tanaquil, a queen of Rome. The work was painted by Beccafumi c. 1519 for the bedroom of Francesco Petrucci, Lord of Siena, part of a series which also included Marcia. In the work the queen is depicted together with only broken architecture and dead plants, she is seen pointing to a tablet which identifies her as Tanaquil.

See also
 Kingdom of Rome

References

External links
 Tanaquil at nationalgallery.org.uk

Cultural depictions of Tanaquil
Paintings by Domenico Beccafumi
1519 paintings